The men's 1500 metres event at the 1968 European Indoor Games was held on 10 March in Madrid.

Results

References

1500 metres at the European Athletics Indoor Championships
1500